Fatemeh Shayan is an Iranian political scientist and assistant professor at the University of Isfahan. Her book titled Security in the Persian Gulf Region won the Farabi International Award.

Career
Shayan is an assistant professor at the University of Isfahan, Iran. Earlier, she was a post-doctoral scholar at University of Tampere (UTA), Finland. She completed her doctoral study, along with many academic publications in international journals, in the Faculty of Management at UTA, and defended her dissertation in December 2014. She was also a researcher at UTA during 2013–2014. Her latest book, Security in the Persian Gulf Region, was published by Palgrave McMillan. Her research areas include energy policy, natural gas, European Union energy issues, Russia, Iran and Qatar energy issues, and Persian Gulf security complex.

Works
 Security in the Persian Gulf Region, Palgrave Macmillan 2016

References

External links
 https://aseold.ui.ac.ir/~f.shayan/

Living people
Farabi International Award recipients
Iranian political scientists
Academic staff of the University of Isfahan
University of Isfahan alumni
University of Tampere alumni
Iranian women academics
Year of birth missing (living people)
Women political scientists
International relations scholars